Nicola Cabibbo (10 April 1935 – 16 August 2010) was an Italian physicist, best known for his work on the weak interaction.

Life
Cabibbo, son of a Sicilian lawyer, was born in Rome. He graduated in theoretical physics at the Università di Roma "Sapienza University of Rome" in 1958 under the supervision of Bruno Touschek. In 1963, while working at CERN, Cabibbo found the solution to the puzzle of the weak decays of strange particles, formulating what came to be known as Cabibbo universality. In 1967 Nicola settled back in Rome where he taught theoretical physics and created a large school. He was president of the INFN from 1983 to 1992, during which time the Gran Sasso Laboratory was inaugurated. He was also president of the Italian energy agency, ENEA, from 1993 to 1998, and was president of the Pontifical Academy of Sciences from 1993 until his death. In 2004, Cabibbo spent a year at CERN as guest professor, joining the NA48/2 collaboration.

Work

Cabibbo's major work on the weak interaction originated from a need to explain two observed phenomena:

The transitions between up and down quarks, between electrons and electron neutrinos, and between muons and muon neutrinos had similar likelihood of occurring (similar amplitudes); and
The transitions with change in strangeness had amplitudes equal to one fourth of those with no change in strangeness.

Cabibbo addressed these issues, following Murray Gell-Mann and Maurice Lévy, by postulating weak universality, which involves a similarity in the weak interaction coupling strength between different generations of particles. He addressed the second issue with a mixing angle θC (now called the Cabibbo angle), between the down and strange quarks.  Modern measurements show that .

Before the discovery of the third generation of quarks, this work was extended by Makoto Kobayashi and Toshihide Maskawa to the Cabibbo–Kobayashi–Maskawa matrix.  In 2008, Kobayashi and Maskawa shared one half of the Nobel Prize in Physics for their work. Some physicists had bitter feelings that the Nobel Prize committee failed to reward Cabibbo for his vital part.  Asked for a reaction on the prize, Cabibbo preferred to give no comment.  According to sources close to him, however, he was embittered.

Later, Cabibbo researched applications of supercomputers to address problems in modern physics with the experiments APE 100 and APE 1000.

Cabibbo supported attempts to rehabilitate executed Italian philosopher Giordano Bruno, citing the apologies on Galileo Galilei as a possible model to correct the historical wrongs done by the Church.

After his death in 2011, the Franklin Institute awarded him with the Benjamin Franklin Medal in Physics.

Death
He died from respiratory problems in a Rome hospital on August 16, 2010, at the age of 75.

For his credits in physics, after his death, a classroom within La Sapienza's "Enrico Fermi" Physics New Department has been named after him in his honour.

See also
Self-consistency principle in high energy physics
Trimaximal mixing

References

External links

Cabibbo biography from the Istituto e Museo di Storia della Scienza 

1935 births
2010 deaths
Scientists from Rome
20th-century Italian physicists
People associated with CERN
Italian Roman Catholics
Academic staff of the Sapienza University of Rome
Presidents of the Pontifical Academy of Sciences
Foreign associates of the National Academy of Sciences
Foreign Members of the Russian Academy of Sciences
Institute for Advanced Study visiting scholars
Theoretical physicists
J. J. Sakurai Prize for Theoretical Particle Physics recipients
Recipients of the Matteucci Medal